Columbia Falls is the name of several places in the United States:

Columbia Falls, Maine
Columbia Falls, Montana
Celilo Falls on the Oregon-Washington border, also known as "Columbia Falls"